Adnan Virk (born July 29, 1978) is a Canadian sportscaster for MLB Network and DAZN who previously worked for ESPN, TSN, and WWE. He also produces and hosts the weekly podcast Cinephile with Adnan Virk show covering cinema news and interviews with entertainment celebrities, and he formerly co-hosted the football podcast The GM Shuffle with former NFL executive Michael Lombardi.

Early life
Virk was born in Toronto, Ontario to Zakaria and Taherah Virk; his parents had immigrated to Canada from Punjab, Pakistan. In 1984 the family relocated to Kingston, then in 1989 to Morven, a small town just outside Kingston, where his parents owned and operated a gas station and Zack's Variety store. After graduating from Ernestown Secondary School, where he played basketball and soccer, Virk studied Radio and Television Arts at Ryerson Polytechnical Institute.

Career
From 2003 to 2009, Virk hosted several programs on The Score, and was an associate producer for Sportscentre at TSN. He was also the co-host of Omniculture and Bollywood Boulevard at Omni Television. In 2009, he joined Maple Leafs Sports and Entertainment (MLSE) as a host and reporter for Raptors TV, Leafs TV and Gol TV Canada.

ESPN
In April 2010, Virk joined the ESPN family of stations in Bristol, Connecticut. After joining ESPN, he became one of three main anchors for Baseball Tonight. During 2014 spring training, he began calling play-by-play for an ESPN affiliate. In the baseball off-season, he hosted SportsCenter and Outside the Lines. He would also fill in for Keith Olbermann on Olbermann. He was the host of a movie podcast Cinephile on ESPN. In addition, he was also the main studio host for ESPN College Football and also hosted College Football Final.

On February 3, 2019, Virk was fired following an investigation regarding leaks of ESPN information to the media. Virk and ESPN later agreed not to pursue litigation against each other.

DAZN and MLB Network
In March 2019, it was announced that Virk would host the new MLB studio program ChangeUp for DAZN, a subscription streaming media service based in London. In addition, Virk will appear on MLB Network. He is also hosting boxing events.

ChangeUp was canceled just prior to the 2020 MLB season.

WWE
On April 12, 2021, it was announced that Virk would become the new play-by-play commentator for Monday Night Raw, replacing Tom Phillips. However, after a negative reception from the fans, six weeks later on May 25, he and the company mutually parted ways because Adnan claimed the schedule was too much for him and his family. He was replaced by Jimmy Smith.

Personal life
Virk was born to a Pakistani Canadian Ahmadi Muslim family, and considers himself a practising Muslim. He lives in New Jersey with his wife Eamon, whom he married in 2007. They have four sons.

References

Further reading

External links

1978 births
Living people
Canadian Ahmadis
Canadian expatriate journalists in the United States
Canadian male journalists
Canadian people of Pakistani descent
Canadian podcasters
Canadian television sportscasters
ESPN people
Major League Baseball broadcasters
National Basketball Association broadcasters
Journalists from Toronto
Professional wrestling announcers
Toronto Metropolitan University alumni
Toronto Raptors announcers